XM (also known as Transmission 1.1 and Transmission 1.2) is a live-in-studio album recorded by British band Porcupine Tree in early 2003 as a live album of mostly In Absentia tracks. This was taken from a session at XM Satellite Radio in Washington D.C. on 12 November 2002, and was originally released as a limited edition tour album. It was later released online on the Porcupine Tree store.

Track listing

Band
 Steven Wilson - Guitars & vocals
 Colin Edwin - Bass
 Richard Barbieri - Keyboards & synthesizers
 Gavin Harrison - Drums
 John Wesley - Guitars & backing vocals (except "Slave Called Shiver" and "Tinto Brass")

Credits
 XM Recording Engineer – Quinton Roebuck
 XM Recording Assistant - Aaron Lee
 Mixing - Steven Wilson (at No Man's Land, UK, December 2002)
 Crew - Ian Bond, Pete Dempsey, Mick Pryde, Ross Elliot, Michael Piper
 Cover photography - Lasse Hoile
 Band photography - Francesca Petrangeli
 Gavin Harrison photography - Oliver Link
 John Wesley photography - Jason Birnie
 Cover design - Carl Glover (for Aleph)

Notes
Features 5 piece touring line up including special guest John Wesley on guitar and backing vocals.
UK Transmission – 1.1 (limited to 1,500, released for the US tour Jul/Aug 2003)
UK Transmission – 1.2 (limited to 1,000, released for the EU tour Nov 2003)

References

Porcupine Tree live albums
2003 live albums
Transmission (record label) live albums